The Well-being of Future Generations (Wales) Act 2015 (anaw 2) is an Act of the National Assembly for Wales that was given royal assent on 29 April 2015; it came into force in April 2016. It set out seven well-being goals: i) a prosperous Wales, ii) a resilient Wales, iii) a healthier Wales, iv) a more equal Wales, v) a Wales of cohesive communities, vi) a Wales of vibrant culture and thriving Welsh language and vii) a globally responsible Wales. A 'sustainable development principle' comprising five aspects is intended to assist in the delivery of the Act's goals and actions; i) long-term thinking, ii) prevention, iii) integration, iv) collaboration and v) involvement.

Application

The Act places duties upon the following bodies operating within Wales:
Welsh ministers
local authorities
local health boards
Public Health Wales NHS Trust
Velindre NHS Trust
national park authorities
fire and rescue authorities
Natural Resources Wales
The Higher Education Funding Council for Wales
The Arts Council of Wales
Sports Council of Wales
National Library of Wales
National Museum of Wales

Parts
The Act has five main parts and is supported by four schedules:
Part 1: Introduction
Part 2: Improving well-being
Part 3: The Future Generations Commissioner for Wales
Part 4: Public Services Boards
Part 5: Final Provisions

Part 1 Introduction
Part 1 of the Act provides an overview.

Part 2 Improving well-being
This part of the Act sets out well-being objectives for Welsh ministers and a duty on public bodies to pursue them also. It describes how performance towards achieving the goals should be measured and provides guidance.

Part 3 The Future Generations Commissioner for Wales
Part 3 of the Act sets out the role of a Future Generations Commissioner which includes a duty to review and make recommendations and sets up a panel to advise the Commissioner. The first Commissioner was Sophie Howe, appointed in 2016 to be in post until 2023.

Part 4 Public Services Boards
Part 4 of the Act establishes public services boards and places a well-being duty upon them. It describes the preparation and review of local well-being plans.

Part 5 Final Provisions
Part 5 of the Act defines public bodies in the context of the legislation, and sets out regulations and other ancillary matters.

Schedule 1
Annual reports by other public bodies

Schedule 2
The Future Generations Commissioner for Wales

Schedule 3
Public Services Boards: Further provision

Schedule 5
Public Services Boards: Consequential amendments and repeals

See also
List of Acts and Measures of the National Assembly for Wales

References

External links
Well-being of Future Generations (Wales) Act 2015

Acts of the National Assembly for Wales